Cuthona divae (rose-pink cuthona) is a species of sea slug, an aeolid nudibranch, a marine gastropod mollusc in the family Tergipedidae.

Distribution
This species was described from Dillon Beach, California, United States. It has subsequently been reported from the Pacific Ocean coast of North America from Vancouver Island, British Columbia, Canada, to Point Loma, San Diego, California.

Ecology
Cuthona divae is reported to feed on the hydroids Hydractinia and Clavactinia milleri, family Hydractiniidae.

References 

Tergipedidae
Gastropods described in 1961